Bulgaria competed at the 1960 Summer Olympics in Rome, Italy. 98 competitors, 89 men and 9 women, took part in 66 events in 12 sports.

Medals

Gold
 Dimitar Dobrev — Wrestling, Men's Greco-Roman Middleweight

Silver
 Krali Bimbalov — Wrestling, Men's Greco-Roman Light Heavyweight
 Nezhdet Zalev — Wrestling, Men's Freestyle Bantamweight
 Stancho Ivanov — Wrestling, Men's Freestyle Featherweight

Bronze
 Velik Kapsazov — Gymnastics, Men's Rings
 Dinko Petrov — Wrestling, Men's Greco-Roman Bantamweight
 Enyu Valchev — Wrestling, Men's Freestyle Lightweight

Athletics

Basketball

Preliminary round

Group B

Boxing

Canoeing

Sprint
Men

Cycling

Five male cyclists represented Bulgaria in 1960.

Road

Track
1000m time trial

Equestrian

Fencing

Two fencers, both men, represented Bulgaria in 1960.

Men's foil
 Boris Stavrev
 Asen Dyakovski

Men's sabre
 Boris Stavrev
 Asen Dyakovski

Football

First round

Group A

Gymnastics

Shooting

Five shooters represented Bulgaria at the 1960 Summer Olympics.
Men

Weightlifting

Men

Wrestling

References

External links
Official Olympic Reports
International Olympic Committee results database

Nations at the 1960 Summer Olympics
1960
1960 in Bulgarian sport